Brit Awards 2000  was the 20th edition of the Brit Awards, an annual pop music awards ceremony in the United Kingdom. They are run by the British Phonographic Industry and took place on 3 March 2000 at Earls Court in London.

Performances

Winners and nominees

List of British Newcomer shortlist

British Dance Newcomer
 Brandon Block
 Groove Armada (Runner-up)
 Phats & Small (Runner-up)
 Shanks & Bigfoot
 Spacedust

British Pop Newcomer
 Adam Rickitt
 Ann Lee
 Charlotte Church
 Martine McCutcheon
 S Club 7 (Winner)

British Rock Newcomer
 The Beta Band
 Death in Vegas
 Gay Dad
 Unkle
 The Wiseguys (Runner-up)

British Urban Newcomer
 Fierce
 Glamma Kid
 Honeyz (Runner-up)
 Jamelia
 Kele Le Roc

Multiple nominations and awards

Notable moments

Robbie Williams and Liam Gallagher
Around the time of his departure from Take That, Robbie Williams had begun a friendship with the Gallagher brothers from Oasis at the Glastonbury Festival. However, it was short-lived and the two parties regularly traded insults in the press with Noel Gallagher referring to Williams as "the fat dancer from Take That". Having won Best British Single and Best Video for "She's the One", Williams challenged Liam Gallagher to a televised fight, saying: "So, anybody like to see me fight Liam? Would you pay to come and see it? Liam, a hundred grand of your money and a hundred grand of my money. We'll get in a ring and we'll have a fight and you can all watch it on TV, what d'you think about that?". Liam Gallagher was not in the country at the time.

Ronnie Wood and Brandon Block
Dance DJ Brandon Block was told by his friends that he had won an award and had been summoned to the stage to collect it. Because of his advanced state of intoxication he believed them and walked on to the stage, eventually ending up next to a bemused Rolling Stones guitarist Ronnie Wood and actress Thora Birch, who were about to present the award for Best Soundtrack Album. After Block was removed from the stage by security, Wood aimed an insult in his direction, at which Block broke free to square up to the guitarist. A series of insults were then traded between the two, both of which were audible through the stage microphone, causing claims that the whole event may have been staged. Wood then threw his drink into Block's face, and the DJ was ejected from the event. Some time after the incident, Block claimed that he had subsequently apologised to Wood for his behaviour, and Wood had merely brushed it off.

Geri Halliwell and the Spice Girls
The Spice Girls were set to receive the Outstanding Contribution award at the 2000 Brit awards, reportedly to mark their dominance of the music scene in the past decade. There was much media speculation before and even during the event as to whether or not former Ginger Spice, Geri Halliwell would accept the award with the four remaining members of the group. On the night, however, Halliwell declined to join her former bandmates and instead ensured front-page coverage the following day by performing her solo single "Bag It Up" straddling a pole between a pair of giant inflatable legs. Near the end of the awards, the Spice Girls performed "Spice Up Your Life", an a cappella version of "Say You'll Be There", "Holler" and "Goodbye". When the group accepted their award for "Outstanding Contribution To Music", they thanked Geri Halliwell for her part in the band's success.

References

External links
Brit Awards 2000 at Brits.co.uk

Brit Awards
BRIT Awards
BRIT Awards
Brit Awards
Brit
Brit Awards